Soest is an electoral constituency (German: Wahlkreis) represented in the Bundestag. It elects one member via first-past-the-post voting. Under the current constituency numbering system, it is designated as constituency 146. It is located in eastern North Rhine-Westphalia, comprising the district of Soest.

Soest was created for the 1980 federal election. Since 2017, it has been represented by Hans-Jürgen Thies of the Christian Democratic Union (CDU).

Geography
Soest is located in eastern North Rhine-Westphalia. As of the 2021 federal election, it is coterminous with the Soest district.

History
Soest was created in 1980. In the 1980 through 1998 elections, it was constituency 118 in the numbering system. From 2002 through 2009, it was number 147. Since 2013, it has been number 146. Its borders have not changed since its creation.

Members
The constituency has been held by the Christian Democratic Union (CDU) during all but one Bundestag term since its creation. It was first represented by Hermann Kroll-Schlüter from 1980 to 1990, followed by Jürgen Augustinowitz from 1990 to 1998. Eike Hovermann of the Social Democratic Party (SPD) was elected in 1998. Bernhard Schulte-Drüggelte regained it for the CDU in 2002 and served until 2017. Hans-Jürgen Thies was elected in 2017.

Election results

2021 election

2017 election

2013 election

2009 election

References

Federal electoral districts in North Rhine-Westphalia
1980 establishments in West Germany
Constituencies established in 1980
Soest (district)